FEDENATUR (European Association of Periurban Parks) is an association of natural, fluvial and agricultural parks located in metropolitan and periurban areas in Europe.   It is headquartered in the Serra de Collserola Natural Park in Barcelona.

FEDENATUR was created in 1997 after the 2nd Symposium on natural areas in periurban and metropolitan zones in Barcelona in 1995.  It was inspired by the Rio Earth Summit of 1992. 

Conference participants decided to create a network of exchanges between periurban park managers on a European scale.
Over 75% of the European population lives in urban and periurban zones. Contrary to "national parks" usually located far from densely populated urban areas and designed exclusively for preservation, the natural areas in periurban zones have to protect biodiversity while being frequented by a larger public.

Projects
FEDENATUR has promoted and participated in three European Interreg projects to technical exchanges and raising awareness on the concept of Periurban Parks.

FEDENATUR has also conducted two surveys. The first (in 2004) to identify periurban parks and list their functions (environmental, social, economic). The second one (2009–2012) to analyse more deeply the characteristics of different periuban parks regarding management, social use and equipment.

In 2005, FEDENATUR joined the European Habitats Forum (EHF), which assembles leading European nature conservation organisations to provide advice on the implementation and future development of EU biodiversity policy.

In 2008, FEDENATUR promoted a Recommendation – that was approved- at the IUCN World Congress in favour of protecting periurban natural areas around cities and metropolitan areas.

FEDENATUR is currently giving input through different documents and mechanisms into the current EC Green Infrastructure Strategy.

FEDENATUR members
 Parc Natural de la Serra de Collserola - Barcelona
 Grand Parc Miribel Jonage - Lyon
 Parco Agricolo Sud Milano - Milan
 Green Belt of Vitoria-Gasteiz - Vitoria-Gasteiz
 Forêts rhénanes périurbaines - Strasbourg
 Monsanto Forest Park - Lisbon
 Arche de la Nature - Le Mans
 Xarxa Parcs Naturals Barcelona - Barcelona Province
 Espaces Nature de Tours - Tours
 Parco di Portofino - Genoa
 Espace Naturel Lille Métropole - Lille
 RomaNatura - Rome
 Parc de l’Espai d’Interès Natural de Gallecs - Mollet del Vallès
 Forêt de Soignes - Sonian Forest - Bruxelles
 - Milan
 Aree protette del Po e della Collina Torinese - Torino
 Espaces Verts Seine-Saint-Denis - Bobigny, Paris
 Parco di Montemarcello-Magra - Sarzana
 Red de Espacios Naturales Protegidos de Andalucía
 Parc agrari de Sabadell - Parc Fluvial del Ripoll - Sabadell
 Parc Devesa-Albufera - Valencia
 Parco della Piana - Florence
 Communauté d'agglomération Grenoble Alpes Métropole
 Parco delle Groane - Milan
 Mount Hymettus Aesthetic Forest - Athens, Attica
 Parco fluviale Gesso e Stura - Cuneo
 SPAY - Union for the Protection and Development of Hymettus Mountain - Vyronas, Attica
 Metropolitan Association of Upper Silesia - Katowice
 Natural Park Drahán - Troja, Prague

See also
Peri-urbanisation

References

External links
 FEDENATUR Official website 
 European Habitats Forum (EHF)
 Purple - Peri-urban regions platform Europe
 Charter on periurban agriculture

Parks